Room Full of Spoons is a 2016 Canadian documentary film directed by Rick Harper about the 2003 cult film The Room.

Synopsis
Rick Harper, longtime associate of Tommy Wiseau, director of the infamous 2003 film The Room, explores the story behind the film's troubled production and researches Wiseau's mysterious background, concluding that he is Polish and originally from the city of Poznań.

Cast
 Rick Harper
 Juliette Danielle
 Philip Haldiman
 Carolyn Minnott
 Robyn Paris
 Scott Holmes
 Dan Janjigian
 Kyle Vogt
 Sandy Schklair
 Michael Rousselet
 Doug Walker
 Alan Bagh

Legal issues
After a brief theatrical run in April 2016, the documentary was quickly pulled when independent theaters reported receiving legal notices of copyright infringement from Tommy Wiseau, the director, writer, producer, and star of The Room. Another attempt to release the film in 2017 to capitalize on the film The Disaster Artist was stymied by Wiseau, who filed an injunction in Ontario courts, preventing a DVD release of the film and setting up a lengthy legal battle. After a final trial in January 2020, the Ontario Superior Court of Justice judge Paul Schabas ruled in favour of the makers of Room Full of Spoons, therefore allowing the film to be marketed and released. He ordered Wiseau to pay the filmmakers roughly $700,000 in court costs and lost revenue.

References

External links
 
 

Documentary films about films
Canadian documentary films
English-language Canadian films
2010s English-language films
2010s Canadian films